The East Sussex Football League is an English association football competition for amateur teams based in East Sussex and south-west Kent. The league has a total of six divisions, headed by the Premier Division, which sits at level 12 of the national league system.

The league was formed in 1896 as the East Sussex Senior League, with the winners of the league competing for the Irish Rifle's Cup against the winners of the West Sussex League also founded in the same year. A second 'Junior' division was formed in 1899; however, by the 1908–09 season league membership was at an all-time low and the league went inactive for two seasons, reforming in 1911. The league was inactive during the First World War and Second World War, but has been running continuously since 1946.

In its early years the league was entered for by the most senior teams in East Sussex with the best sides from local leagues entering the competition. Over the course of its history the league has seen its geographical catchment area shrink due to the formation of the Mid-Sussex League and Brighton League, with the formation of the Sussex County League and additional divisions further up the pyramid affecting the standard of the league.

The league currently acts as a feeder to the Southern Combination Football League and the Premier Division of the Mid-Sussex Football League, with the top two teams who possess the required ground grading eligible to apply for promotion.

History
The league was founded in 1896 consisting of seven founder members who were Brighton Athletic, Eastbourne Swifts, East Grinstead, Hailsham, Hastings, Lewes and North End Rangers (Brighton). The first winners of the competition were Hastings, who went on to compete for the Irish Rifle's Cup to become the champions of Sussex, losing out to Southwick, winners of the West Sussex League. An additional 'Junior' division, which primarily contained reserves teams of those in the 'senior' division, was created in 1899 and league membership remained steady throughout the early 1900s, but by the 1908–09 season there were only five teams playing in one division and the league was inactive for two seasons. The league reformed in 1911, but membership remained low until the competition was abandoned due to the outbreak of World War I in 1914.

The league returned after the First World War and enjoyed a steady membership throughout the 1920s and 1930s, with Rock-a-Nore, Rye United and Sidley United winning the league during the period; Hollington United and Hastings Rangers, who have a long association with the league, also enjoyed successful seasons. By 1939 the number of teams competing was up to 14, but the outbreak of World War II saw the league abandoned once again.

The league returned after the War for the 1946-47 season and the following seasons saw Hastings Rangers, Hollington United and Rye United dominate the league and other local competitions; however, the league would go onto lose Rye and Hastings to the newly formed Second Division of the Sussex County League in 1952, with Sidley United and Hastings & St Leonards also making the move. Hailsham won the league in the 1954-55 season and left to join the Sussex County League.  The rest of the 1950s and 1960s was mostly dominated by Rye United Reserves, with Wadhurst winning the league in 1964 before joining the County League.

By the mid 1970s the league had expanded to five divisions, with a large number of teams joining from the Hastings League. During this period the league saw more clubs from the Eastbourne area and Kent also join the league. Teams from areas such as Alfriston, East Dean and Polegate played in the league during the 1970s, but numbers dwindled by the 1990s, with teams from this area seemingly opting to compete in the Mid-Sussex League. From Kent, teams like Tenterden, Hawkhurst United and Wittersham were successful in the 1970s and 1980s, with Hawkhurst still competing in the league.

In recent years the league has seen Shinewater Association, Wadhurst, Seaford, Westfield and Little Common enjoy league titles en route to the County League, with Langney Wanderers being the most recent club to do so in the 2012-13 season.

Current structure

The most senior division in the league is the Premier Division which is at the intermediate level of football, whilst Divisions One to Five are at junior level. Reserve and third teams from clubs playing at a higher level have competed in the league throughout its history, with Bexhill United, Little Common, Langney Wanderers and Westfield all having fielded reserve and third teams in recent seasons. The league acts a feeder to the Southern Combination League, though it is likely that any teams based in Kent would join the Southern Counties East. In the past the Hastings League and Eastbourne League would have acted as feeders to the league, before their demise due to low numbers. Any teams transferring to and from the league typically transfer from neighbouring leagues of similar standard, such as the Mid-Sussex League, Ashford & District League and the Kent County League.

The league is currently sponsored by Macron Store Hastings, which provides all match balls for teams in the league, having previously been sponsored by the ADA restaurant, based in Hastings. Two of the three league cup competitions are also sponsored, with the East Sussex Challenge Cup, sponsored by Premier Travel and the Division Two & Three Cup sponsored by Wisdens Sports; Division Four and Five Cup is currently not sponsored and known as the Chairman's Challenge Cup.

League Cups
The league currently run three cup competitions, the most senior being the East Sussex Challenge Cup (Premier Travel Cup) founded in 1911 as an invitational trophy for teams in East Sussex, which is now competed for by teams in the Premier Division and Division One. Teams in the league also compete in the Hastings FA and Eastbourne FA run cup competitions, as well as the Robertsbridge Charity Cup competitions.

Member clubs 2022–23

Premier Division
Bexhill Amateur Athletic Club
Bexhill Town
Crowhurst
Hawkhurst United
Punnetts Town
Robertsbridge United
Rock-a-Nore (Old Hastings)
Rye Town
Sidley United
St. Leonards Social
Westfield Reserves

Division One
AFC Hollington
AFC Jesters
Battle Town Reserves
Little Common Reserves
SC Pass Move Arrows
Sandhurst
South Coast Athletico
The Junior Club Tackleway
Wadhurst United

Division Two
Bexhill Rovers
Hollington United Reserves
Hooe
Icklesham Casuals 
Ninfield
Northiam 75
Peche Hill Select
SC Pass Move Arrows Reserves
Sedlescombe Rangers Reserves
Sidley United Reserves
Victoria Baptists

Division Three
Bexhill Amateur Athletic Club Reserves
Catsfield
Crowhurst Reserves
Hastings Comets
Herstmonceux
Mountfield United
Orington
Parkfield
Rye Town Reserves
Sovereign Saints Reserves
Ticehurst
Westfield Thirds

Division Four
Battle Town Thirds
Burwash
Hastings Athletic
Hawkhurst United Reserves
Robertsbridge United Reserves
SC Pass Move Arrows Thirds
Sedlescombe Rangers Development
The Junior Club Tackleway Reserves
Welcroft Park Rangers Reserves
Westfield Fourths

Champions

For the 1899-1900 season the league added a secondary 'Junior' Division.

The 'Junior Division' was dropped ahead of the 1901-02 season.

The league was inactive for the 1909-10 and 1910-11 seasons.

Between 1915 and 1919 the competition was suspended due to the First World War.

The league was split into two divisions for the 1939-40 season, with Hastings Rangers winning the play-off game between the Eastern and Western champions.

The league was abandoned due to the outbreak of World War II with the league resuming for the 1946-47 season.

For the 1959-60 season the league added a second division.

Two more divisions were formed for the 1967-68 season.

Division Five was formed for the 1969-70 season.

For the 1969-70 season Division One was split into Division One East and Division One West.

For the 1971-72 season, the top teams of each Division One table was placed in the new Premier Division, whilst the other sides were put into Division One.

Division Six was added during the 1990s, though which year it was added is currently unknown.

For the 2000-01 season, only the Premier Division completed the season, the rest of the league was abandoned due to a combination of adverse weather and the foot-and-mouth outbreak.

For the 2009-10 season, the league formed Division Seven.

The league dropped Division Seven ahead of the 2012-13 season

The league dropped Division Six ahead of the 2015-16 season

External links
 Official website
 Hastings Football History - East Sussex League

 
Football leagues in England
Football in East Sussex